George Chichester Smythe (1843–1902) was an Irish Anglican priest  in the second half of the 19th century and the first decade of the 20th.

Smythe was born in County Antrim and educated at Trinity College, Dublin. Smythe began his ecclesiastical career with a curacythen Vicar of Carnmoney from 1853 to 1893; and Archdeacon of Connor from then until his death.

References

19th-century Irish Anglican priests
20th-century Irish Anglican priests
Archdeacons of Connor
Alumni of Trinity College Dublin
1902 deaths
1843 births
People from County Antrim